Rajin (also Romanized as Raj‘īn, Raja’īn, and Raj’īn) is a village in Zanjanrud-e Pain Rural District of Zanjanrud District of Zanjan County, Zanjan province, Iran. At the 2006 National Census, its population was 1,762 in 461 households. The following census in 2011 counted 1,603 people in 489 households. The latest census in 2016 showed a population of 1,640 people in 541 households; it was the largest village in its rural district.

References 

Zanjan County

Populated places in Zanjan Province

Populated places in Zanjan County